Chemistry is an American drama-comedy television series that debuted on Cinemax on August 19, 2011. It follows the affair, bordering on erotic madness, of a policewoman and an attorney, which began after the former saved the latter from a car wreck. The last episode of its first season aired on November 18, 2011.

Cast and characters
 Ana Alexander as Liz Campano: An LAPD policewoman and Michael's primary love interest. She was a painter and expressed her feelings through her art.
 Jonathan Chase as Michael Strathmore: A corporate lawyer. His affair with Liz risked both his profession and personal life.
 Ragan Brooks as Jocelyn Delacorte: Michael's fiancée.  She eventually became aware of Michael's affair and left him on their third anniversary. She later returned and wanted a polyamorous relationship.
 Chad Everett as Vic Strathmore: Michael's late father and relationship adviser.  He was married eight times, the last union to a car showroom model named Chantal, and felt his multiple divorces impacted Michael's views on relationships. Vic died in the series finale.
 Sally Kellerman as Lola: Liz's eccentric neighbor.  She was an artist and claimed to have been intimate with Sigmund Freud and Pablo Picasso. She was seen exclusively in cut scenes.
 Jeremy Kent Jackson as Luther: Michael's colleague. Nearly everything that he mentioned had a sexual connotation.
 Asante Jones as Preston Hull: Liz's police partner.  He was an aspiring author and joined the force to do research for a novel.
 Eric Pierpoint as Arthur Delacorte: Father of the Delacorte sisters and boss of Michael and Luther.
 Augie Duke as Pemmie Delacorte: Jocelyn's sister and paramour of Luther. She had a husband named Seth and was on parole for an undisclosed crime.
 Angel McCord as Merle.
 Jessica Clark as Chantal Strathmore: Vic's wife and Michael's stepmother.
 Morgan Fairchild as Michael's Mother: She appeared on the series finale to settle Vic's estate after his death.

Episodes

Ratings
The episode "Downtime" which aired on September 30, 2011 garnered 0.242 million viewers, a 0.2 Household rating, and a 0.1 Adults 18-49 rating.

References

External links
 

2011 American television series debuts
2011 American television series endings
2010s American comedy-drama television series
American thriller television series
Cinemax original programming
Television series by Warner Bros. Television Studios
Erotic television series
English-language television shows
Television shows set in Los Angeles
Television series created by Richard Christian Matheson
Fictional portrayals of the Los Angeles Police Department